Alan Griffin may refer to:

 Alan Griffin (basketball) (born 2000), American basketball player
 Alan Griffin (politician) (born 1960), Australian politician